Penbedw is a country estate near Nannerch, Flintshire, Wales. Penbedw Hall was demolished by developers some time after 1969.

Its parks and gardens are listed as Grade II* in the Cadw/ICOMOS Register of Parks and Gardens of Special Historic Interest in Wales.

References

Villages in Flintshire
Registered historic parks and gardens in Flintshire